Tankhun Jitt-itsara (born April 4, 1979, in Na Bon district, Nakhon Si Thammarat province) is a Thai politician and former actor with TV host.

Biography and entertainment career
Born as Ekachai Buranapanit (เอกชัย บูรณผานิต) in Thai family of Chinese Hokkien descent in Nakhon Si Thammarat, southern region. He became widely known as an actor and model in the '90s. Known performances include Torfun Gub Marwin, TV series in 1996 and The Iron Ladies, a ladyboy sport-comedy film based on true events in early 2000.

The turning point in his life was his father's sudden death in October 2000. Ekachai, as the eldest son, was responsible for the family instead, and made him begin to study Dharma along with changing his name and surname as he is today.

His another well-known work in the showbiz was as a host on the hit game show Fan Pan Tae on Channel 5 between 2007 and 2009.

He is also an expert in Chinese and a serious student of Buddhism.

Political career
Jitt-itsara first political role was when he was running for general election in 2011 in Don Mueang constituency with Democrat Party, he was not elected. When lost to the influential local politician Karun Hosakul of the Pheu Thai Party.

He became a Bangkok MP for the first time in mid-2013 by-election in Don Mueang constituency to replace Hosakul who was disqualified from the Election Commission's decision. Jitt-itsara defeated Yuranunt Pamornmontri a candidate from Pheu Thai Party, made him become the first Don Mueang's Democrat MP in almost 40 years.

See also
2013 Bangkok by-election

References

External links 
 

Tankhun Jitt-itsara
Tankhun Jitt-itsara
1979 births
Living people
Tankhun Jitt-itsara
Tankhun Jitt-itsara
Tankhun Jitt-itsara
Tankhun Jitt-itsara
Tankhun Jitt-itsara
Tankhun Jitt-itsara
Tankhun Jitt-itsara
Buddhist studies scholars